Mahi is a name of multiple origins, found in various countries.

People with the given name Mahi
 Mahi Beamer (born 1928), Hawaiian singer and hula dancer
 Mahi Binebine (born 1959), Moroccan painter and novelist
 Mahi B. Chowdhury (born 1969), Bangladeshi politician
 Mahi Gill, Indian actress
 Mahi Khennane (born 1936), French-Algerian footballer
 Mahi V Raghav, Indian film producer and writer

People with the family name Mahi
Ginni Mahi (born 1999), Indian singer
Mahiya Mahi, Bangladeshi film actress

People with the nickname Mahi
 Mahendra Singh Dhoni, Indian cricketer known as Mahi

See also
 Mahi (disambiguation)